Kazan explosion may refer to:

 1917 Kazan Gunpowder Plant fire
 2008 Kazan gas explosion